The rivière du Loup (in English: river of Wolf) is a tributary of the east bank of the Chaudière River which flows northward to empty onto the south bank of the St. Lawrence River, in the region administrative office of Chaudière-Appalaches, in Quebec, in Canada.

The rivière du Loup empties on the east bank of the Chaudière River at a place called Sartigan, near Saint-Georges. It is the most important tributary of the Chaudière River in the county of Beauce.

Toponymy 
The toponym Rivière du Loup was made official on February 28, 1980, at the Commission de toponymie du Québec.

See also 

 List of rivers of Quebec

References 

Rivers of Chaudière-Appalaches
Le Granit Regional County Municipality
Beauce-Sartigan Regional County Municipality